The Whispers is an American science fiction drama television series created and co-executive produced by Soo Hugh with executive producers Steven Spielberg, Justin Falvey, Darryl Frank and Dawn Olmstead for ABC Studios.
It is based loosely on the 1951 Ray Bradbury short story "Zero Hour" from The Illustrated Man. The pilot episode was ordered to series on May 8, 2014, and debuted on ABC on June 1, 2015. On October 19, 2015, ABC canceled the series after one season.

Premise
A series of accidents occurs around children, who all communicate with the same invisible and seemingly imaginary friend called Drill. They secretly play his "games" in return for rewards that Drill promises. Claire Bennigan, an FBI child specialist, investigates and finds connections not only between the different children's cases, including her own son, but also to her missing husband.

Cast

Main
 Lily Rabe as Special Agent Claire Bennigan, an FBI child specialist who investigates a series events connected to an invisible entity named "Drill" – an alien that only communicates with children. She is Sean's wife, Henry's mother and Wes' former lover.
 Milo Ventimiglia as Captain Sean Bennigan, a U.S. Air Force pilot believed to have died in a plane crash, who resurfaces as the target of a citywide manhunt when he is found to be under Drill's influence. He is Claire's estranged husband and Henry's father.
 Kyle Harrison Breitkopf as Henry Bennigan, Claire and Sean's young son, who becomes a friend of Drill and player of his game after Drill cures his deafness and brings his father back to him.
 Barry Sloane as Wes Lawrence, a high-ranking Defense Department operative with close ties to the President and the various corridors of power. Wes is the head of Special Projects Division at the DOD, previously working as Assistant Director of the FBI. Wes is Lena's estranged husband, Minx's father and Claire's former lover.
 Kristen Connolly as Lena Lawrence, Wes' estranged wife and Minx's mother, who is left vulnerable and unmoored when she discovers Drill is turning her own daughter against her.
 Derek Webster as Special Agent Jessup Rollins, a freshly divorced and deeply rigid FBI agent and Claire's new partner. He is reluctant and skeptical regarding the investigation into Drill, although he later faces the truth.
 Catalina Denis as Dr. Maria Benavidez, a doctor caught up in the investigation of Drill after Sean takes her hostage.
 Kylie Rogers as Millicent "Minx" Lawrence, Wes and Lena's young daughter, who becomes a friend of Drill and player of his game.

Recurring

 David Andrews as Haley Frommer, the Secretary of Defense and Wes' boss, who aspires to the presidency.
 Dee Wallace as Willie Starling, Claire's mother and Henry's grandmother.
 Alan Ruck as Alex Myers, Executive Director of the FBI, Claire and Jessup's boss and Wes' former superior.
 Jamison Jones as Harrison Weil, Amanda's husband and Harper's father, Harrison is an important nuclear scientist who is head of the Nuclear Regulatory Commission.
 Autumn Reeser as Amanda Weil, Harrison's wife and Harper's mother, Amanda is involved in a serious accident caused by Drill, the resulting investigation beginning the events of the series.
 Abby Ryder Fortson as Harper Weil, Harrison and Amanda's young daughter who is a friend of Drill and player of his "game", and is the first player identified by the FBI after her mother's accident.
 Alison Araya as Callie, Lena's friend during her troubles with Wes.

 Catherine Lough Haggquist as Renee, Wes' secretary at the DOD.
 Arien Boey as Lucas, a boy who is a friend of Drill and player of his game.

 Maeve Dudley as Jane, a nine-year-old girl who is a friend of Drill and player of his game.

 Terrell Ransom Jr. as Ethan, Renee's son who is a friend of Drill and player of his game.

 Gwynyth Walsh as Dr. Catherine Tully, a renowned outer space expert recruited by the government to work on the investigation into Drill.
 Olivia Dewhurst as Kelly, a girl who is a friend of Drill and player of his game.

 Martin Cummins as President Chip Winters, the President of the United States. (Played by Gary Hershberger in the first episode.)
 Kirsten Robek as Beth Winters, the First Lady of the United States.
 Kayden Magnuson as Cassandra Winters, the First Daughter of the United States who is a friend of Drill and player of his game.

 Jay Paulson as Thomas Harcourt, Ron's son, who has a bad relationship with his father. He was an early friend of Drill and player of his game, which led to him killing his own brother.
 John Billingsley as Ron Harcourt, Thomas' father, a NASA satellite communications expert, who has a bad relationship with his son.
 Logan Williams as Elliot Harcourt, Thomas' brother who was the first child possessed by Drill back in 1982. Thomas figured it out and killed Elliot.

 Darien Provost as Nicholas Brewstar, a bullying victim who becomes a friend of Drill and player of his game.
 Tom Butler as Daniel Goetz / "Man in Blazer", a reporter for the Baltimore Observer working to expose Drill to the public. He claims Dr. Benavidez contacted him shortly after she was taken hostage by Sean.

Episodes

Production
On May 23, 2014, it was announced the series would no longer film in Los Angeles, California, and would move to Vancouver for filming. On June 11, 2014, it was announced that Brianna Brown, who was set to play Lena Lawrence, had exited the series due to creative reasons. 
Production on the first season wrapped on December 20, 2014. On June 30, 2015, it was announced that ABC had let the contracts for the cast expire and if the series were to be picked up for a second season, Lily Rabe would only appear in a limited number of episodes. On October 19, 2015, ABC announced that it had canceled The Whispers after only one season.

Release

Broadcast
Seven Network aired the show in Australia.

Home media
The Whispers was released on DVD in Region 1 on November 11, 2017.

Reception
The Whispers has received generally favorable critical reception. The review aggregator website Rotten Tomatoes reports a 74% approval rating with an average rating of 6.8/10 based on 32 reviews. The website's consensus reads, "Though predictable and, at times, poorly paced, The Whispers is a structurally sound and stimulating supernatural mystery with an enjoyable ensemble of creepy kids." On Metacritic, the series holds a score of 61 out of 100, based on 21 critics, signifying "generally favorable reception".

References

External links
 
 

2010s American drama television series
2010s American mystery television series
2010s American science fiction television series
2015 American television series debuts
2015 American television series endings
Adaptations of works by Ray Bradbury
American Broadcasting Company original programming
American fantasy television series
English-language television shows
Serial drama television series
Television series based on short fiction
Television series by Amblin Entertainment
Television series by ABC Studios
American fantasy drama television series